Umm Hurair is a locality in Dubai, United Arab Emirates (UAE). Umm Hurair has a small residential community as well as a shopping and economic district with shopping malls, hotels, banks and restaurants. 

Umm Hurair is divided to two sub-communities:
 Umm Hurair 1 is located in the heart of Bur Dubai, across Al Mankhool and Al Karama. Important landmarks in Umm Hurair 1 include BurJuman shopping mall, Bur Dubai Spinneys and the Golden Sands chain of hotels.
 Umm Hurair 2 is the locality bordering the Dubai Creek in between the Floating Bridge and the Al Garhoud Bridge.  Umm Hurair 2 is home to newer real estate development projects such as Dubai Healthcare City, Al Boom Tourist Village and Dubai Creek Park.

Umm Hurair 1 and 2 are geographically separated by the localities of Al Nasr (Oud Metha) and Al Karama.

References

External links

Populated places in Dubai
Communities in Dubai